Laukahi   is a village development committee in Sunsari District in the Kosi Zone of south-eastern Nepal. It lies in koshi Gaupalika-01. At the time of the 1991 Nepal census it had a population of 6565 people living in 1591 individual households.

References

Populated places in Sunsari District